Candida R. Moss (born 26 November 1978) is an English public intellectual, journalist, New Testament scholar and historian of Christianity, who is the Edward Cadbury Professor of Theology in the Department of Theology and Religion at the University of Birmingham. A graduate of Oxford and Yale universities, Moss specialises in the study of the New Testament and martyrdom in early Christianity.

Early life and education
Born in 1978 in London, England, Moss attended Hanford School and The Godolphin and Latymer School. She graduated from Worcester College, Oxford, in 2000 with a B.A.(Hons) in theology. In 2002 she received an M.A.R. in Biblical studies from Yale Divinity School. In 2006, Moss graduated from Yale University with an M.A. and an M.Phil in religious studies, followed by a PhD in religious studies in 2008.

Moss is a kidney transplant recipient. In April 2018 she married Justin Foa, president and CEO of international insurance brokerage company Foa & Son.

Academic career
Moss began her career at the University of Notre Dame in South Bend, Indiana, and became a full professor there in 2012, four years after receiving her PhD from Yale. Moss has specialized in the study of martyrdom, ancient medicine and the New Testament, early Christian ideas about the resurrection of Jesus's physical body, and enslaved literate workers in the ancient world. 

Moss has written three books on martyrdom. Her first, The Other Christs: Imitating Jesus in Ancient Christian Ideologies of Martyrdom, was the recipient of the 2011 John Templeton Award for Theological Promise. Her 2012 book, Ancient Christian Martyrdom, argued that post-Enlightenment bias against martyrdom had led scholars to think of martyrdom as a phenomenon that spread from one region of the Roman empire to another. Against this, Moss argues that martyrdom developed differently in different contexts. In 2013 her book The Myth of Persecution: How Early Christians Invented a Story of Martyrdom was published, in which she argues that the stories of early Christian martyrdom "have been altered ... edited and shaped by later generations of Christians" and none of them are "completely historically accurate". Additionally, she maintains that the Roman authorities did not actively seek out or target Christians and that only for a brief period of no more than twelve years in the first three centuries of Christian history were Christians prosecuted by order of a Roman emperor. In a review of her first two books published in 2013 Edinburgh classicist Lucy Grig wrote that "Candida Moss has swiftly established herself as one of the most interesting and original scholars working on early Christian martyrdom."

In August 2017 Moss joined the faculty of the Department of Theology and Religion at the University of Birmingham as Edward Cadbury Professor of Theology. She is a research associate at the Institute for the Study of the Ancient World at New York University.

Moss is an advocate for public academic scholarship. Her writing has been praised for its "readability, clarity...creativity, thoughtfulness, and wit." She is a columnist for The Daily Beast and has contributed to the Los Angeles Times, Politico, The New York Times, BBC Online, BBC Radio 4's In Our Time, CNN.com, The Washington Post, HuffPost, The Chronicle of Higher Education, and Times Higher Education. She served as papal news contributor for CBS News, an academic consultant to the television series The Bible, and as a frequent contributor to the National Geographic Channel, History Channel, Travel Channel, and Smithsonian Channel.

Honours
Moss received the Charlotte W. Newcombe Award from the Woodrow Wilson National Fellowship Foundation, the John Templeton Award for Theological Promise from the John Templeton Foundation, and a NEH Summer Seminar Grant from the National Endowment for the Humanities. In 2015 she was shortlisted for the Hiett Prize and a Religion Newswriters Association award. In 2016 her co-authored book Reconceiving Infertility was shortlisted for the American Academy of Religion Book Prize for Textual Studies. In 2017 her co-authored book Bible Nation: The United States of Hobby Lobby was selected as a Publishers Weekly 2017 Best Book in Religion. She was elected a member of Studiorum Novi Testamenti Societas in 2013.

Selected works

Thesis

Books

Edited volumes

Peer-reviewed journal articles
 "Reading Between the Lines: Looking for the Contributions of Enslaved Literate Laborers in a Second Century Text," Studies in Late Antiquity 5 (2021): 432-52
 "Infant Exposure and the Rhetoric of Cannibalism, Incest, and Martyrdom in the Early Church," Journal of Early Christian Studies 29:3 (2021): 341-396.
 "Fashioning Mark: Early Christian Discussions about the Scribe and Status of the Second Gospel,” New Testament Studies 67:2 (2021): 181-204.
 Co-authored with Liane M. Feldman. "The New Jerusalem: Wealth, Ancient Building Projects, and Revelation 21-22,” New Testament Studies 66:3 (2020): 351-66.
 “Dying to Live Forever: Identity and Virtue in the Resurrection of the Bodies of the Martyrs,” Irish Theological Quarterly 84:2 (2019): 155-174.
 "A Note on the Death of Judas in Papias,” New Testament Studies 65:3 (2019): 388-97.
 "The Marks of the Nails: Scars, Wounds, and the Resurrection of Jesus in John,” Early Christianity 8:1 (2017): 48-68
 "Nailing Down and Tying Up: Lessons in Intertextual Impossibility from the Martyrdom of Polycarp,” Vigiliae Christianae 67:2 (2013): 117-136.
 “Christly Possession and Weakened Bodies: A Reconsideration of the Function of Paul's Thorn in the Flesh (2 Cor. 12:7-10),” Journal of Religion Disability and Health 16:4 (2012): 319-333.
 “The Discourse of Voluntary Martyrdom: Ancient and Modern,” Church History 81:3 (2012): 531-551. 
 Co-Authopred with Jeffrey Stackert “The Devastation of Darkness: Disability in Exodus 10:21-23, 27, and the Intensification of the Plagues,”  Journal of Religion 92:3 (2012): 362-372.
 Co-authored with Joel S. Baden. “1 Thess 4:13-18 in Rabbinic Perspective,”  New Testament Studies 58 (2012): 1-16.
 “Blurred Vision and Ethical Confusion: The Rhetorical Function of Matt 6:22-23,” Catholic Biblical Quarterly 73:4 (2011): 757-76.
 Co-authored with Joel S. Baden. “The Origin and Interpretation of sara ‘at in Leviticus 13-14,” Journal of Biblical Literature 130:4 (2011): 643-661.
 “Heavenly Healing: Eschatological Cleansing and the Resurrection of the Dead in the Early Church,” Journal of the American Academy of Religion 79:3 (2011) 1-27.
 “The Man with the Flow of Power: Porous Bodies in Mark 5:25-34,” Journal of Biblical Literature 129:3 (2010): 507-519.
 “On the Dating of Polycarp: Rethinking the Place of the Martyrdom of Polycarp in the History of Christianity,” Early Christianity 1:4 (2010): 539-574.
 “The Transfiguration: An Exercise in Markan Accommodation,” Biblical Interpretation 12:4(2004): 69-89.

See also
Barrett Foa - brother-in-law

References

External links
 Official website
 University of Birmingham Webpage
 Daily Beast Columns
 Atlantic Articles

1978 births
Living people
New Testament scholars
University of Notre Dame faculty
Yale Divinity School alumni
Female biblical scholars
Women classical scholars
Alumni of the University of Oxford
Women Christian theologians
Academics of the University of Birmingham